Arthur Griffith (1871–1922) was the founder and third leader of Sinn Féin.

Arthur Griffith may also refer to:
Sir Arthur Griffith (Australian politician) (1913–1982), Australian politician; member of the Western Australian Legislative Assembly
Arthur F. Griffith (1880–1911), calculating prodigy
Arthur Hill Griffith (1861–1946), Australian politician; minister in the Government of New South Wales

See also
Arthur Griffin (disambiguation)
Arthur Griffiths (disambiguation)